Murder Among Friends is a 1982 made for television British film directed by David Greene and starring Leslie Nielsen and Sally Kellerman.

A "farcical mystery", it was originally written by Bob Barry for the New York stage in 1975.  The stage production debuted on Broadway's Biltmore Theater and starred Janet Leigh and Jack Cassidy.  Debuting on December 28, 1975, it ran for seventeen performances, closing on January 10, 1976.  It received mixed reviews.

Plot

Cast
 Leslie Nielsen
 Sally Kellerman
 Tony Margulies as Body Guard
 Joy Michelle Moore

Reception

References

External links

1982 films
1982 drama films
1980s English-language films
Films directed by David Greene
Films scored by Arthur B. Rubinstein
British drama films
1975 plays
1980s British films